Coldwater Creek is a stream in Miami County, Kansas and Cass County, Missouri in the United States. It is a tributary of the South Fork of the South Grand River.

Coldwater Creek was so named due to the cold water it carries.

See also
List of rivers of Missouri

References

Rivers of Cass County, Missouri
Rivers of Miami County, Kansas
Rivers of Missouri
Rivers of Kansas